is a 1993 side-scrolling beat 'em up video game released by Capcom for the Super Nintendo Entertainment System (known as the Super Famicom in Japan). It is the direct sequel to the 1989 coin-operated arcade game Final Fight, which was previously also released for the SNES. Final Fight 2 was developed by Capcoms consumer division with no preceding coin-op version. The game was re-released onto Wii's Virtual Console service in 2009 for the North American and European regions.

Unlike the SNES version of the first game, Final Fight 2 supports two-player simultaneous play and has a total of three playable characters. The only playable character from the first game to return is Mike Haggar. Two new player characters were introduced: Carlos Miyamoto and Maki Genryusai. In the game's plot, the three battle the resurgent Mad Gear gang at various locations around Asia and Europe to rescue Maki's sister and father, who are also the fiancée and teacher respectively of Guy from the first Final Fight.

Capcom followed up the game with another SNES-exclusive sequel, Final Fight 3, which saw the return of Guy to the series. None of the new characters from Final Fight 2 returned, although Maki made appearances in various Capcom fighting games years later.

Gameplay

Final Fight 2 does not deviate much from the original Final Fight in terms of gameplay, although unlike the SNES version of the first game (and the alternate version Final Fight Guy), Final Fight 2 features a two-player cooperative mode in addition to the single-player mode. The player has a choice between three characters: Haggar, who uses professional wrestling techniques; Maki, a female master of the fictional ninjutsu school of Bushin-ryū Ninpō, similar to Guy from the first game; and Carlos, a South American martial artist of Japanese descent who uses a sword for his Special Move. Through use of a code, two players can select the same character. Like in the original game, each character has their own set of fighting techniques and abilities unique to each character.

The gameplay remains the same as in the original game. The player has two main action buttons (Attack and Jump), which when pressed together, makes the player's character perform their Special Move (a third button can also be assigned for this purpose). The player proceed through levels fighting against hordes of underlings before reaching a boss character at the end of each stage. Health-restoring food items and other bonus point items are hidden away in breakable drums and barrels. There are also three retrievable weapons in the game, a tonfa, a piece of lumber and a knife. There is also a "Genryusai Doll" which makes the player invulnerable for a limited period and a "Guy Doll" which gives the player an extra life.

There is a total of six stages in the game, each set in a distinct Eurasian location: Hong Kong, France, Holland, England, Italy and Japan. As in the original game, the player will be pitted against numerous types of recurring enemy characters thorough the game. The only returning enemy characters from the original SNES game are the Andore family. Rolento, a boss character who was in the first Final Fight but omitted from the SNES port, appears as a boss character in this game (with his name spelled "Rolent").

The player can adjust the difficulty (along with other settings) of the game in the options menu. Like in Final Fight Guy, each difficulty setting reveals only a certain portion of the ending, with the full ending being shown only by completing the game on the Expert setting.

The Japanese version of Final Fight 2 features two enemy characters named Mary and Eliza, who are knife-wielding female enemies with acrobatic techniques. Mary and Eliza were replaced by two substitute characters named Leon and Robert in the international versions of the game. Additionally, the first stage boss Won Won, wields a meat cleaver in the Japanese version, which was also removed in the overseas versions.

Plot
Sometime after the defeat of the Mad Gear gang, Mike Haggar and his friends, Cody and Guy, have returned to their normal lives; Cody goes on vacation with his girlfriend Jessica, Guy departs on a training journey, and Haggar continues to run Metro City as Mayor. However, the surviving Mad Gear members have secretly regrouped under a new leader to seek their revenge. They begin by kidnapping Guy's fiancée Rena in Japan, along with her father, Guy's former sensei Genryusai.

Rena's younger sister, Maki Genryusai, calls Haggar and informs him of the situation. Accompanied by his friend Carlos Miyamoto, Haggar travels to Eurasia and meets up with Maki, and the three of them join forces to take on the newly revived Mad Gear. After a series of fights in several countries, the trail leads to Japan where they fight Retu, the new leader of the Mad Gear. The three defeat Retu and rescue Genryusai and Rena. Guy then writes a letter to his friends from abroad thanking them for all they have done.

Reception

In Japan, the game topped the Famitsu sales charts in May 1993. Worldwide, the game sold over one million copies.

Power Unlimited gave the game a score of 75% writing: "Final Fight 2 is such a kind of game that is actually no longer made these days. The number of moves is very limited, just like the number of different enemies and levels. So you get through it quickly." Super Gamer gave an overall review score of 79% summarizing: "Simultaneous two-player and great sprite graphics. Unfortunately, gameplay is dated with just one attack move."

Lucas M. Thomas of IGN, in the review of the 2009 Virtual Console release, called it "decent brawler experience" even as "pretty straightforward" and "a bit bland", although wondering why Guy was not included when his fiancée was kidnapped in the story. 

Nevertheless, the staff of GamesRadar ranked it as the 31st best SNES game: "We were afraid the sequel might see similar limitations, but this one was built from the ground up for Nintendo’s super console, so everything we’d want from an arcade Final Fight 2 made its way to the cartridge. This was the Final Fight we always wanted."  In 2018, Complex listed it 76th on their "The Best Super Nintendo Games of All Time" saying the game is better than its predecessor in every way.

References

External links

1993 video games
Capcom beat 'em ups
Cooperative video games
Final Fight games
Video games about ninja
Side-scrolling beat 'em ups
Super Nintendo Entertainment System games
Video games developed in Japan
Video games featuring female protagonists
Video games scored by Yasuaki Fujita
Virtual Console games
Virtual Console games for Wii U
Video games set in Hong Kong
Video games set in France
Video games set in the Netherlands
Video games set in England
Video games set in Italy
Video games set in Japan
Video game sequels